The 2003 Canoe Slalom World Cup was a series of five races in 4 canoeing and kayaking categories organized by the International Canoe Federation (ICF). It was the 16th edition. The series consisted of 4 regular world cup races and the world cup final.

Calendar

Final standings 

The winner of each world cup race was awarded 30 points. Semifinalists were guaranteed at least 5 points and paddlers eliminated in heats received 2 points each. The world cup final points scale was multiplied by a factor of 1.5. That meant the winner of the world cup final earned 45 points, semifinalists got at least 7.5 points and paddlers eliminated in heats received 3 points apiece. Only the best four results of each athlete counted for the final world cup standings.

Results

World Cup Race 1 

The first world cup race of the season took place at the Penrith Whitewater Stadium, Australia from 10 to 11 May.

World Cup Race 2 

The second world cup race of the season took place at the Segre Olympic Park in La Seu d'Urgell, Spain from 5 to 6 July.

World Cup Race 3 

The third world cup race of the season took place at the Tacen Whitewater Course, Slovenia from 12 to 13 July.

World Cup Race 4 

The fourth world cup race of the season took place at the Čunovo Water Sports Centre, Slovakia from 30 to 31 July.

World Cup Final 

The Čunovo Water Sports Centre in Bratislava also hosted the final race of the season from 2 to 3 August.

References

External links 
 International Canoe Federation

Canoe Slalom World Cup
Canoe Slalom World Cup